Glou is the debut album from Puerto Rican reggaeton singer Glory. She composed almost all of the songs on the album.

Track listing 
 "Intro" – 0:46
 "Perreo 101" (Glory) – 3:03
 "Acelerá" (Glory, Álex Quiles) – 4:06
 "La Traicionera" [featuring Don Omar] (Glory, Don Omar, Eduardo Reyes) – 4:10
 "Dale, Dale" (José Miguel Velázquez) – 3:18
 "Sin Freno" (Glory) – 3:35
 "Un Paso" (Glory, Eric Pérez, Eduardo Reyes) – [ – 3:30
 "Ahora Regresas" (Glory) – 3:31
 "A Popolear" [feat Valentino] (Glory) – 3:31
 "Flor del Barrio" [featuring Gallego] (Glory, José Raúl González, Álex Quiles) – 4:30
 "Te Vas" (Glory) – 4:11
 "Lento" (Glory, Marvin Rasario D., Eric Pérez) – 3:36
 "La Popola" (Glory) – 3:13
 "Outro" – 2:16

Singles 
 "La Popola", later re-released
 "Perreo 101"
 "La Tracionera" [featuring Don Omar]
 "Acelerá"
 "Lento"
 "Un Paso"

Chart performance

Facts 
 "Te Vas" is featured on "Reggaeton Hitmakers Love Stories".
 "Outro" is featured on "Reggaeton Best Remix".
 She is signed to Don Omar's All Star Records
 The song "La Popola" has been banned in many Latin American countries due to its vulgar lyrics. In the Dominican Republic "Popola" is slang for a woman's vagina.

References

External links 
 
 Listen to samples of the album

2005 debut albums
Reggaeton albums